In enzymology, a kynurenine 3-monooxygenase is an enzyme that catalyzes the chemical reaction

-kynurenine + NADPH + H+ + O2  3-hydroxy--kynurenine + NADP+ + H2O

Kynurenine 3-monooxygenase is the expression product of the KMO (gene). The systematic name of this enzyme class is -kynurenine, NADPH:oxygen oxidoreductase (3-hydroxylating). Other names in common use include kynurenine 3-hydroxylase, kynurenine hydroxylase, and -kynurenine-3-hydroxylase.  It participates in tryptophan metabolism through the kynurenine catabolic pathway. This enzyme belongs to the family of oxidoreductases, to be specific, those acting on paired donors, with O2 as the oxidant. Kynurenine 3-monooxygenase catalyzes the insertion of molecular oxygen into the aromatic ring of kynurenine to produce 3-hydroxy--kynurenine. It employs one cofactor, FAD. Kynurenine 3-monooxygenase serves as an important branch point in the kynurenine pathway and, as a result, is an attractive drug target for immunological, neurodegenerative, and neuroinflammatory diseases. Currently, most research on the kynurenine 3-monooxygenase enzyme has been focused primarily on rat models and in yeast, both of which have been demonstrated to have high sequence homology with the human kynurenine 3-monooxygenase protein. Studies have shown the beneficial effects of enzyme inhibition in these eukaryotic kynurenine 3-monooxygenase active sites, thus making this enzyme an attractive target for human drug design.

Structure 
Kynurenine 3-monooxygenase is a dimer containing asymmetric subunits and has one FAD-binding domain as its prosthetic group. Kynurenine 3-monooxygenase contains a linker region involved in substrate binding following a second strand of an antiparallel β-sheet, a six-stranded antiparallel β-sheet domain, and an α-helix at the carboxy-terminal. The hydrophobic C-terminus acts as the mitochondrial anchoring domain and participates in enzymatic activity.

Active site 
While no scientific literature reports a crystal image of a kynurenine 3-monooxygenase complex with -kynurenine, structural studies of the enzyme in yeast co-crystallized with UPF 648 reveal how the FAD cofactor and substrate are bound in the active site. Chemical similarities between UPF 648 and -kynurenine suggest that the substrate binds adjacent to the Re-face of the flavoprotein. A loop containing the residues Pro321–Gln325 is believed to be the oxygen-binding site above the re-side of the FAD prosthetic group.

Each monomer contains a conserved hydrophobic pocket (residues Leu221, Met230, Ile232, Leu234, Phe246, Pro321, Phe322) positioned around the substrate’s aromatic benzene moiety.  A conserved Gln325 polar residue is also involved in hydrogen bonding on the -kynurenine carbonyl group, as well as on the hydrogen on the FAD N3 atom. Arg83 and Tyr97 also form polar contacts with the carboxylate in the amino acid moiety on the substrate.

Mechanism 
Kynurenine-3-monooxygenase catalyzes the hydroxylation of -kynurenine to 3-hydroxy--kynurenine with concomitant interconversion of NADPH to NADP+. The reaction mechanism is not entirely known, but is believed to follow mechanisms related to the flavin-dependent monooxygenases. After -kynurenine binds, NADPH reduces FAD and leaves as NADP+. Oxygen then binds and creates an -kynurenine-FAD-hydroperoxide intermediate. This intermediate is the electrophilic source for the hydroxylation reaction, yielding a primary ketimine form of the product and the C4a-hydroxy-FAD. Tautomerization yields 3-hydroxy--kynurenine in complex with the enzyme (E Fl HOH-P). Dissociation of 3-hydroxy--kynurenine and H2O leads to the free enzyme (E Flox).

Biological function
Kynurenine 3-monooxygenase catalyzes the conversion of -kynurenine to 3-hydroxy--kynurenine, an important bioactive metabolite in the kynurenine pathway. The kynurenine pathway is responsible for over 95% of tryptophan oxidative degradation. -Kynurenine is an important branch point of this metabolic pathway, being converted into the neurotoxin 3-hydroxy--kynurenine via kynurenine 3-monooxygenase, the neuroprotectant kynurenic acid through kynurenine amino transferases, or anthranilic acid by kynureninase.

Kynurenine 3-monooxygenase regulates the downstream production of quinolinic acid, which can generate reactive free radicals and activates the NMDA subtype of glutamate receptors, producing excitotoxic lesions in the central nervous system of mammals. Quinolinic acid is also the bioprecursor of NAD+.

Inhibition of kynurenine 3-monooxygenase leads to an increase of kynurenic acid in the kynurenine pathway. This metabolite functions as an antagonist of the α7 nicotinic acetylcholine receptor and as an antagonist at the glycine site of the NMDA receptor. As a result, regulation at the kynurenine 3-monooxygenase enzyme determines the neurotoxic and neuroprotective potential of the kynurenine pathway.

Disease relevance
Kynurenine 3-monooxygenase is an attractive drug target for several neurodegenerative and neuroinflammatory diseases, especially Huntington's, Alzheimer's, and Parkinson's disease. Administration of potent enzyme inhibitors has demonstrated promising pharmacological results. Specifically, genetic elimination of the kynurenine 3-monooxygenase enzyme has been shown to suppress toxicity of the huntingtin protein in yeast and Drosophila models of Huntington's disease.

Kynurenine 3-monooxygenase deficiency, which can be caused by genetic polymorphisms, cytokines, or both, leads to an accumulation of kynurenine and to a shift within the tryptophan metabolic pathway towards kynurenic acid and anthranilic acid. Recent research suggests that hyperphysiologic concentrations of kynurenine in kynurenine 3-monooxygenase-deficient patients results in a shift towards kynurenic acid production, believed to be related to cognitive deficits in predictive pursuit and visuospatial working memory. Kynurenine-3-monooxygenase deficiency is associated with disorders of the brain (e.g. schizophrenia, tic disorders) and of the liver.

References

 
 
 

EC 1.14.13
NADPH-dependent enzymes
Flavoproteins
Enzymes of known structure